Luke Richard Chapman (born 21 March 1991) is an English former footballer who played as a midfielder.

He left Port Vale in October 2009 after making one appearance for the club. Following this he spent a brief time with Hednesford Town, before joining Rocester in 2010. He signed with Stafford Rangers in summer 2011, before joining Sutton Coldfield Town in October 2011.

Career
Chapman worked his way through the Port Vale youth team and made his first team debut as a last minute substitute for Danny Glover in the final game of the 2007–08 season –  a 1–1 draw with Southend United at Roots Hall. However a serious knee injury meant he did not feature for the main team in the 2008–09 season.

He was transfer listed in September 2009, along with the entire Port Vale squad, after manager Micky Adams saw his team slip to a third consecutive defeat. He left the club by mutual consent the following month. He signed with Hednesford Town of the Southern Football League, making three appearances during the season, scoring once against Leamington in the Southern League Cup. In summer 2010 he signed with Rocester of the Midland Football Alliance, despite an offer from Atherstone Town. He went on to score eight goals in seventeen league (and three cup) games in 2010–11.

In July 2011, he signed with Stafford Rangers of the Northern Premier League Premier Division but left in October 2011 and joined Sutton Coldfield Town. The club finished 12th in the Northern Premier League Division One South in 2011–12, and then sixth in 2012–13 and 2013–14.

Personal life
Born in Cannock, Chapman attended Cannock Chase High School. He is a Walsall supporter.

Career statistics

References

1991 births
Living people
People from Cannock
English footballers
Association football midfielders
Port Vale F.C. players
Hednesford Town F.C. players
Rocester F.C. players
Stafford Rangers F.C. players
Sutton Coldfield Town F.C. players
English Football League players
Southern Football League players
Midland Football Alliance players
Northern Premier League players